Sahitya Akademi Award for Bodo language is given each year, since 2005, by Sahitya Akademi (India's National Academy of Letters), to writers and their works, for their outstanding contribution to the upliftment of the language.

Winners

References

Bodo
Bodo language
Sahitya Akademi Award